Konjed Kar (also Romanized as Konjed Kār) is a village in Jahangiri Rural District, in the Central District of Masjed Soleyman County, Khuzestan Province, Iran. At the 2006 census, its population was 60, in 12 families.

References 

Populated places in Masjed Soleyman County